Lebedodes ianrobertsoni is a moth in the family Cossidae. It is found in Tanzania, where it has been recorded from the central subregion of the Eastern Arc Mountains probably extending further east into the drier coastal forests.

The length of the forewings is about 9 mm. The forewings are pale orange-yellow with buckthorn brown transverse lines and striae. The hindwings are ivory yellow, but ecru-olive with a narrow line along the termen.

Etymology
The species is named for Ian Robertson.

References

Natural History Museum Lepidoptera generic names catalog

Endemic fauna of Tanzania
Metarbelinae
Moths described in 2009